Mathematical optimization is the theory and computation of extrema or stationary points of functions.

Optimization, optimisation, or optimality may also refer to:

 Engineering optimization
 Feedback-Directed Optimisation, in computing
 Optimality model in biology
 Optimality Theory, in linguistics
 Optimization (role-playing games), a gaming play style
 Optimize (magazine)
 Process optimization, in business and engineering, methodologies for improving the efficiency of a production process
 Product optimization, in business and marketing, methodologies for improving the quality and desirability of a product or product concept
 Program optimization, in computing, methodologies for improving the efficiency of software
 Search engine optimization, in internet marketing
Supply chain optimization, a methodology aiming to ensure the optimal operation of a manufacturing and distribution supply chain

See also 

 Optimum (disambiguation)
 Optimality theory (disambiguation)
 Optimism (disambiguation)
 Optimist (disambiguation)
 Optimistic (disambiguation)
 
 Maximization (disambiguation)
 Minimization (disambiguation)